OCCT may refer to:

 Oceanic-Creations Composite Technology, a process for producing a carbon fibre based construction material
 OCC Transport, at the Binghamton University
 Oklahoma Core Curriculum Tests, a standardized test
 Open CASCADE Technology, a software library

 Over Clock Checking Tool